René Binet (1731, near Beauvais – 1812, Paris) was a French professor and translator. He was professor of rhetoric at the collège du Plessis, rector of the Université de Paris in 1791, then proviseur (director) of the lycée Bonaparte.

Traductions 
From the Latin
 Horace : Œuvres (1783)
 Valerius Maximus : Œuvres (2 volumes, 1795)
 Virgil : Œuvres (4 volumes, 1803–1804)
From the German
 Christoph Meiners : Histoire de la décadence des mœurs chez les Romains et de ses effets dans les derniers tems de la République (1794)

French translators
French philologists
Grammarians from France
1812 deaths
1731 births
French male non-fiction writers
Translators of Virgil